Kilsby and Crick was a railway station on the Northampton Loop Line serving the villages of Kilsby and Crick in Northamptonshire. It was located to the eastern side of where the railway crossed the A5 road at the site now occupied by the Daventry International Rail Freight Terminal. It was located about a mile from Kilsby and one and a half from Crick.

The station was opened along with the line in 1881, by the London and North Western Railway which became part of the London Midland and Scottish Railway during the Grouping of 1923. The line then passed on to the London Midland Region of British Railways on nationalisation in 1948.

The station closed to passengers on 1 February 1960 and to goods on 6 July 1964. Most of the station was demolished, but part of the goods platform to the west of the A5 still survives.

See also
Rugby Parkway railway station - a proposed new station a short distance away.

References

 The Last Days Of Steam In Northamptonshire, by John M.C. Healy (1989)

External links
 Kilsby and Crick station on navigable 1954 O. S. map
 Photograph of Kilsby & Crick station - Flickr.com

Disused railway stations in Northamptonshire
Former London and North Western Railway stations
Railway stations in Great Britain opened in 1881
Railway stations in Great Britain closed in 1960
1881 establishments in England